The Asia Pacific Geoparks Network (APGN) is the regional geopark network of the Global Geoparks Network (GGN) and the UNESCO International Geosciences and Geoparks Programme (UNESCO-IGGP). Its main role is to coordinate the activities of GGN in the UNESCO regions of Asia and the Pacific, to promote networking between global geoparks and geopark professionals in the region and to provide support for sustainable economic development in geopark areas. As of 2020 February, the APGN had 60 institutional members (UNESCO Global Geoparks) in countries. The Pacific region is currently not represented by a global geopark, but there are ongoing geopark projects, just as in other countries of Asia.

Organization 
The APGN was founded in 2007 based on the proposal at the 1st Asia Pacific Geoparks Symposium in Langkawi (Malaysia). It was endorsed by GGN in 2008 and became its official regional geopark network in 2013, in compliance with its Rules of Operation.

Governing bodies 
The governing bodies of the regional network as an agency are:
 Advisory Committee: comprises the representatives of the founding members of the APGN, who meet annually to make the decisions on memberships and supporting programmes on geoheritage conservation, promotion of geoheritage education and awareness, and monitor the progress of the network
 Coordination Committee: made up of two official nominated representatives from each UNESCO Global Geopark of the network(a geoscientist and a specialist on geoparks development or governance) and a representative from UNESCO. It meets twice a year and overviews the admission of new members to the network and has an advisory role of geopark governance. 
 Secretariat: providing the daily management of the network, supported by the Chinese Geoparks Network and the office of GGN in Beijing.

Regional Administrative Members
The personnel recognized as official members of the regional agency are:
 Institutional Members: UNESCO Global Geoparks (UGGp) located in the Asia Pacific Region.
 Individual Members:  professionals of geoconservation, sustainable development, tourism development, and environmental issues of GGN in Asia and the Pacific
 Honorary Members: individuals who have rendered exceptional service to the UNESCO Global Geoparks community or to the GGN from the Asia Pacific region
 National Representatives: nominated by member countries to represent them in the Advisory Committee (AC) and Coordination Committee (CC).
 Cooperating Members: international organizations, institutions, or individuals providing substantial financial or other assistance to GGN/APGN.

Asia Pacific Global Geopark membership

List of geoparks in the Asia Pacific region

The region only approximately follows continental guidelines. Turkey and Russia are in the European network. Iran is in the Asia Pacific. Otherwise the country distribution is Australasia.

Map of Asia Pacific geoparks

Asia Pacific geoparks by nation
The member states of the APGN have established national geopark networks. By UNESCO rules a geopark must first apply for membership in the national geopark network and be accredited there before it can apply to membership in the regional geopark network. Having been accredited in the latter they may apply to the global network. This bottom-up method helps to insure that the member nations organize the activities of GGN on a national level first.

Meetings and activities
As a regional geopark network, APGN is the organizer of several workshops and seminars, capacity building activities, common projects, promotional activities, and common publications between the member countries and UNESCO Global Geoparks. Besides the regular meetings of the Advisor and Coordination Committees, the most important events of the network are the biennial symposiums, a place of exchange on research activities and management practices in geoparks.

See also
Geopark
Geotourism
Global Geoparks Network
European Geoparks Network
Latin America and the Caribbean Geoparks Network
African Geoparks Network

References

External links 

 Asia Pacific Geoparks Network (Accessed: 27 February 2020)

Asia
Asia
Asia